Classic Produktion Osnabrück (often referred to as cpo, in lowercase) is a record label founded in 1986 by Georg Ortmann and several others. Its declared mission is to fill niches in the recorded classical repertory, with an emphasis on romantic, late romantic, and 20th-century music. The label also aims to release complete cycles of recordings, such as complete sets of symphonies, concertos, chamber music, and so forth. It is the house label of online retailer jpc.

Recordings
Recordings issued by cpo include (see second external link; some of these are no longer available)

Concertos, suites, cantates, chambermusic etc. of Georg Philipp Telemann
The complete orchestral works and string quartets of Paul Hindemith
The complete string quartets of Mieczysław Weinberg
The complete orchestral works of Erich Wolfgang Korngold
The orchestral works of Hans Pfitzner (and a substantial amount of his chamber works as well)
The symphonies and string quartets of Benjamin Frankel
The symphonies and orchestral works of Théodore Gouvy
The symphonies, concertos and string quartets of Ahmet Adnan Saygun
The symphonies and overtures of Ferdinand Ries
The symphonies and overtures of Friedrich Ernst Fesca
The orchestral works (symphonies and overtures) of Louise Farrenc (and a substantial amount of her chamber works as well)
The symphonies, violin concerto and requiem of Richard Wetz
The symphonies of Hendrik Andriessen
The symphonies of Kurt Atterberg
The symphonies of Allan Pettersson
The symphonies of Wilhelm Peterson-Berger
The symphonies of Ture Rangström
The symphonies of Humphrey Searle
The symphonies of George Onslow
The complete symphonies and (select) concertos of Aulis Sallinen
The complete wind quintets of Anton Reicha
The violin concertos and symphonies of Louis Spohr
The symphonies of Josef Tal

Some of these works (for example, most of the Hindemith compositions, Spohr's symphonies, some of Spohr's concertos, and various Pfitzner orchestral pieces) had been recorded in the past, by other performers on other labels; but quite a few of them had not.

See also
 List of record labels

Notes

References
About cpo 
Composers and recordings available on cpo 
An interview with Burkhard Schmilgun, A&R manager for cpo 

German record labels
Record labels established in 1986
Classical music record labels
1986 establishments in West Germany